Papaver degenii, the Pirin poppy, is a poppy endemic to the Pirin Mountains of south-western Bulgaria where it is found at altitudes from 2,100 to 2,900 m. It is included in the Red Book of Bulgaria as vulnerable species. It is considered by some authors to be conspecific with the Alpine poppy (Papaver alpinum).

The Pirin poppy is a perennial herbaceous plant. The stems is 5 to 15 cm long. The leaves are skewered, swallowed, their portions are ovoid. There are four 13-15 mm long petals coloured from bright yellow to orange. The stamens are numerous with yellow anthers. It blooms from July to August. It is distinguished from the other species of poppy in Bulgaria by the basal leaves and the colour of the petals.

This poppy is very rare and is found in low numbers; there could be as few as a few dozen individuals on 100 m2 It is found on limestone rocks on the slopes of Pirin's highest summit Vihren (2,914 m), the knife-edge ridge Koncheto that links the peaks Kutelo (2,908 m) and Banski Suhodol (2,884 m), Golemiya Kazan cirque and the surrounding summits. There areas are protected within the Pirin National Park and the Bayuvi Dupki–Dzhindzhiritsa nature reserve.

References 

degenii
Endemic flora of Bulgaria
Pirin
Plants described in 1970